
Uberaba Lake is a lake in the Santa Cruz Department of Bolivia and Mato Grosso, Brazil. Located at an elevation of 190 m, its surface area is 400 km2.

Lakes of Brazil
Bolivia–Brazil border
International lakes of South America
Lakes of Santa Cruz Department (Bolivia)
Landforms of Mato Grosso